Großer Auesee is a lake in Kreis Minden-Lübbecke, North Rhine-Westphalia, Germany. At an elevation of 45 m, its surface area is 4.5 ha.

Lakes of North Rhine-Westphalia
LGrosser Auesee